Sir Stephen Mackenzie FRCP (14 October 1844 – 3 September 1909) was a British physician, knighted in 1903.

Life
Mackenzie had three brothers and five sisters, and was born at Leytonstone, Essex, England. He was a son of Stephen Mackenzie, a general practitioner and surgeon, a brother of the laryngologist Sir Morell Mackenzie, and a nephew of the actor Henry Compton. Stephen Mackenzie the younger was educated at Christ's Hospital in 1853–1859 and at the medical college of the London Hospital in 1866–1869 after medical apprenticeship to Dr. Benjamin Dulley, his eventual father-in-law. Mackenzie was a medical resident at the London Hospital and studied for a year at Aberdeen, where he became M.B. in 1873 and M.D. in 1875. After working in 1873 at the Charité Hospital connected with the University of Berlin, he returned to London in late 1873 and then spent the remainder of his career working as a physician at the London Hospital before retiring in 1905 due to health problems.

Mackenzie wrote numerous articles for medical periodicals and for Quain's Dictionary of Medicine, Allbutt's System of Medicine, and Heath's Dictionary of Practical Surgery.

References

1844 births
1909 deaths
19th-century English medical doctors
20th-century English medical doctors
Alumni of the London Hospital Medical College
Fellows of the Royal College of Physicians
People from Leytonstone